Ruth Atkinson Holmes (1909 - December 5, 1981) was an American painter and philanthropist. She was a member of the "Summit Trio" in Summit, Mississippi in the 1960s.

Life
Holmes was born in Hazlehurst, Mississippi in 1909. She was educated at the Mississippi University for Women, Mississippi College, Tulane University, and Southwest Mississippi Junior College.

Holmes became an encaustic painter in her spare time. In the 1960s, she began exhibiting her work with Bess Phipps Dawson and Halcyone Barnes in Summit, Mississippi. The three artists became known as the "Summit Trio." Holmes donated art to the Mississippi Museum of Art, and African artwork to Delta State University.

Holmes was married twice: first to F. C. Atkinson, with whom she had a son, and secondly to Louie M. Holmes. She resided in Summit with her first husband and in McComb with her second husband, where she died on December 5, 1981. Her funeral was held at the J.J. White Memorial Presbyterian Church.

References

1909 births
1981 deaths
People from Hazlehurst, Mississippi
People from Summit, Mississippi
People from McComb, Mississippi
Mississippi University for Women alumni
Mississippi College alumni
American women painters
Painters from Mississippi
Philanthropists from Mississippi
Tulane University alumni
20th-century American painters
20th-century American philanthropists
20th-century American women artists